Luizinho Faleiro (born 26 August 1951) is an All India Trinamool Congress politician from Goa who served as a General Secretary in the All India Congress Committee of Indian National Congress since 2013 and was In-charge of the 7 North Eastern States of Manipur, Meghalaya, Mizoram, Sikkim, Arunachal Pradesh, Nagaland and Tripura. Previously he served two terms as the eighth Chief Minister of Goa. Faleiro was credited with devising strategies and stitching alliances that led to formation of Governments in Mizoram, Meghalaya, Arunachal Pradesh and Manipur. In 2013 was Chairman of the Karnataka Pradesh Assembly Elections Screening Committee, following which the Congress won the Karnataka Assembly Elections. He quit the Indian National Congress on 27th September, 2021 to join the All India Trinamool Congress on 29th September, 2021. He is married to Rachel Faleiro and is the father of two sons, Lenin, Rabindra and only daughter Rania.

Member of Goa Legislative Assembly
Luizinho Faleiro has served as the MLA of Navelim Constituency for seven terms. He won the 1979 election with 7715 votes; the 1984 election with 9126 votes (the next candidate polled 3472 votes. The 1989 election without any opponent; the 1994 election with 8178 votes (the next candidate polled 1107 votes); the 1999 election with 12054 votes (the next candidate polled 2293 votes); and the 2003 election with 10254 votes (the next candidate polled 5668 votes).

In 2017, he won the elections from Navelim Constituency once again.

Education 
Luizinho Faleiro holds a master's degree in Commerce and is also a Graduate in Law.

References

1951 births
Living people
Chief Ministers of Goa
Indian National Congress politicians
Leaders of the Opposition in Goa
Chief ministers from Indian National Congress
Goa MLAs 2017–2022
Trinamool Congress politicians from Goa
Rajya Sabha members from West Bengal